

The Lioré et Olivier H-190 was a flying boat airliner produced in France in the late 1920s. Conventional for its day, it was a single-bay biplane with un-staggered wings, its single engine mounted tractor-fashion underneath the upper wing and supported on struts in the interplane gap. Early examples had the pilot's open cockpit located aft of the wing, but this was later relocated forward of the wing.

Developed as a passenger transport, versions of the H-190 were also built as catapult-ready mail planes intended to be launched from transatlantic liners, and as coastal patrol aircraft.

The sole LeO H-194 was flown by Marc Bernard together with a CAMS 37 flown by René Guilbaud in a long-distance expeditionary flight across Africa in late 1926. They covered  in three months, covering Morocco, Mali, Nigeria, Belgian Congo, Mozambique and Madagascar.

Variants
H-190T("Transport") - airliner powered by a  Gnome-Rhône 9Ab Jupiter engine; (5 built).
H-191trainer powered by a  Lorraine 12Eb; (1 built).
H-192airliner similar to H-190T, but with cockpit in new position, powered by a  Gnome-Rhône 9Ab Jupiter; (2 built).
H-193similar to H-192, but with reinforced wing, powered by a  Gnome & Rhône 9Ady; (5 built).
H-193S(S - "Surveillance") - maritime patrol version of H-193, powered by a  Gnome-Rhône 9Ad Jupiter; (15 built).
H-193HSH-193S with a  Hispano-Suiza 12Mb engine; (1 converted).
H-194version for long-distance flight, powered by a  Gnome-Rhône 9Ab Jupiter; (1 built).
H-195
H-196similar to H-193, powered by a  Gnome-Rhône 9Ab Jupiter; (1 built).
H-197S(Sanitaire) - air ambulance version of H-193, powered by a  Gnome-Rhône 9Adz Jupiter; (1 built).
H-198catapult-capable mailplane, powered by a  Gnome-Rhône 9Af Jupiter;  (9 built).
H-198/2catapult-capable airliner with a  Renault 12Ja engine; (3 built).
H-199/1twin-engine version, with second engine mounted in pusher-fashion in tandem with the first: examples with 2x  Hispano-Suiza 6Mbr; (1 built).
H-199/2twin-engine version, with second engine mounted in pusher-fashion in tandem with the first: 2x   Gnome-Rhône 7Kb engines; (1 built).

Operators

French Navy

Specifications (H-193S)

References

1920s French airliners
Flying boats
H-190
Single-engined tractor aircraft
Biplanes